PMTair (Progress MulTi Air) was a Cambodian airline offering regularly scheduled domestic and international passenger and cargo services out of Phnom Penh International Airport.

History
PMTair was founded on 14 January 2003 and was owned by Progress Multitrade Co., Ltd. A certificate of airworthiness was issued by the Cambodian Civil Aviation Authority on October 14, 2003.

The airline was dissolved in 2008,

Destinations

Upon closure, PMTair served the following destinations:

Cambodia
Siem Reap - Angkor International Airport base
Korea, South
Busan - Gimhae International Airport
Seoul - Incheon International Airport
Vietnam
Hanoi - Noi Bai International Airport

Former routes
PMTair suspended all domestic flights in the wake of the crash of PMTair Flight U4 241.

Pattaya-Siem Reap
Bangkok-Phnom Penh
Hanoi-Phnom Penh
Phnom Penh-Ratanakiri-Siem Reap
Ratanakiri-Phnom Penh
Siem Reap-Phnom Penh
Siem Reap-Sihanoukville

Fleet
The PMTair fleet included the following aircraft (as of 30 August 2008):

2 Antonov An-12 (cargo)
1 Antonov An-24
2 Boeing 737-200
2 McDonnell Douglas MD-83 (one aircraft is operated for Wind Rose Aviation)

Accidents and incidents
On November 21, 2005, a Yunshuji Y7-100C operated by PMTair left the runway when landing at Ban Lung, Ratanakiri and sheared a leg off its landing gear. Fifty-nine passengers and six crew members were aboard. There were no injuries. The aircraft was XU-072, leased from Royal Phnom Penh Airways, and formerly operated by President Airlines. As a result of this accident, United Nations personnel were barred from using the airline.
On June 25, 2007, PMTair Flight U4 241, an Antonov An-24 with 16 passengers and six crew crashed in a mountainous jungle area of Kampot Province. The flight had departed Angkor International Airport and was heading for Sihanoukville International Airport, and disappeared from radar at around 10:40 a.m. local time (0340 UTC). Aboard were 13 South Koreans and three Czech passengers, and the crew of one Uzbekistani pilot and five Cambodians. Because of weather and rugged terrain, search-and-rescue crews took two days to find the crash site. No survivors were found.

References

External links

Official Website (Archive)
PMTair Fleet

Defunct airlines of Cambodia
Airlines established in 2003
Airlines disestablished in 2008
2008 disestablishments in Cambodia
Cambodian companies established in 2003